Palan-e Narges (also Romanized as Pālān-e Narges) is a village in Dasht-e Hor Rural District, in the Central District of Salas-e Babajani County, Kermanshah Province, Iran. At the 2006 census, its population was 277, in 47 families.

References 

Populated places in Salas-e Babajani County